KMRF (1510 AM) is a radio station broadcasting a religious radio format. Licensed to Marshfield, Missouri, United States, it serves the Springfield MO area.  The station is currently owned by New Life Evangelistic Center.

External links

MRF
MRF